Ya Libnan Oh Lebanon, is a Lebanese media outlet that delivers English-language news from Beirut to an international audience. Ya Libnan was founded by volunteers in Lebanon immediately after the assassination of Rafik Hariri on 14 February 2005. Since its inception, Ya Libnan has transformed from a blog-style format maintained by three volunteers to an official news site that is supported by over 100 multi-national volunteers.

Media coverage of Ya Libnan
In 2005 The Washington Posts Jefferson Morley called Ya Libnan "The New Media kid on the block". The site started as a web presence for the massive street demonstrations that took place after Hariri's assassination and evolved into a daily news site with cosmopolitan, liberal politics.

References

Further reading 
 Chrenkoff.  "Chrenkoff Interviews Ya Libnan". 17 June 2005.
 Landberg, Reed. "Rice, Straw Call for UN Action Against Syria". Bloomberg L.P.. 23 October 2005.

External links
 Ya Libnan — news
 Ya Libnan TV — videos

2005 establishments in Lebanon
Publications established in 2005
Lebanese news websites
English-language websites
Middle Eastern news websites
Mass media in Beirut
Asian news websites